Maludam, Saribas is a very small town and sub district in Betong Division,  Sarawak, Malaysia. It is made up of a small town including some modern longhouses with a few Malay fishing villages nearby. The majority of people are Malays, with some Ibans and Chinese. Maludam was made a district in 1985.

The main tourist attraction in the area is Maludam National Park.

Neighbouring settlements include:

References

External links
 

Towns in Sarawak